The Research Data Alliance (RDA) is a research community organization started in 2013 by the European Commission, the American National Science Foundation and National Institute of Standards and Technology, and the Australian Department of Innovation. Its mission is to build the social and technical bridges to enable open sharing of data. The RDA vision is researchers and innovators openly sharing data across technologies, disciplines, and countries to address the grand challenges of society. The RDA is a major recipient of support in the form of grants from its constituent members' governments.

As of May 2021, the RDA has over 11,000 individual members from 145 countries.

Structure 
The RDA's main vehicle for outputs are 18-month long working groups that generate recommendations aimed at the RDA community. In addition to working groups, interest groups with no fixed lifetime can produce either informal or "supported" outputs which carry some degree of RDA endorsement.

Meetings 

The RDA organises two major plenary conferences a year that are often co-located within other international data sharing initiatives such as the 12th RDA plenary being part of "International Data Week, 2018" in Gaborone, co-organised by RDA, the ICSU World Data System (WDS), the ICSU Committee on Data for Science and Technology (CODATA), University of Botswana (UoB) and the Academy of Science of South Africa (ASSAf). RDA aims to spread the plenary meetings across many of its members' locales with recent plenaries being held in Helsinki, Philadelphia, Berlin, Gaborone, Montréal, Barcelona, Denver, Tokyo, Paris, San Diego, Amsterdam, Dublin, Washington DC and Gothenburg, Sweden. Edinburgh, Costa Rica and Melbourne have hosted virtual plenaries.

Partnerships 

The RDA provides national data sharing organisations, such as the Australian National Data Service (ANDS), an "influence over the kinds of data sharing environments that Australian researchers will work with when they collaborate with international colleagues". The RDA is partnered with many major international data initiatives such as DataCite and frequently forms joint working groups with them, such as with the World Data System.

References

External links
 

Research organizations
Organizations established in 2013